Roman Begala (born 18 July 1999) is a professional Slovak footballer who currently plays for Slavoj Trebišov as a midfielder.

Club career

MFK Zemplín Michalovce
Begala made his Fortuna Liga debut for Zemplín Michalovce against Slovan Bratislava on 27 July 2018. He replaced Stanislav Danko three minutes before the end of a 3:0 defeat.

References

External links
 
 
 Futbalnet profile 
 

1999 births
Living people
People from Vranov nad Topľou
Sportspeople from the Prešov Region
Slovak footballers
Association football midfielders
FC VSS Košice players
MFK Zemplín Michalovce players
FK Slavoj Trebišov players
Slovak Super Liga players
2. Liga (Slovakia) players